Kdybych byl tátou  is a 1939 Czechoslovak comedy film, directed by Miroslav Cikán. It stars Jindřich Plachta, Hana Vítová, and Bohunka Nosková.

References

External links
Kdybych byl tátou  at the Internet Movie Database

1939 films
Czechoslovak comedy films
1939 comedy films
Films directed by Miroslav Cikán
Czechoslovak black-and-white films
1930s Czech films